Ullachiya District is one of ten districts of the province Carabaya in Peru.

Geography 
The Kallawaya mountain range and the Willkanuta mountain range traverse the district. Some of the highest mountains of the district are listed below:

Ethnic groups 
The people in the district are mainly indigenous citizens of Quechua descent. Quechua is the language which the majority of the population (83.96%) learnt to speak in childhood, 15.48% of the residents started speaking using the Spanish language (2007 Peru Census).

See also 
 Chichakuri

References